Upper Macungie Township is a township in Lehigh County, Pennsylvania. The population of Upper Macungie Township was 26,377 as of the 2020 U.S. census, making it the fourth fastest-growing municipality in Pennsylvania in terms of total population gain from 2010 to 2020. The township was created in 1832 when Macungie Township was divided into Upper and Lower Macungie townships. It is part of the Lehigh Valley metropolitan area, which had a population of 861,899 and was the 68th most populous metropolitan area in the U.S. as of the 2020 census.

Geography
It is drained by tributaries of Little Lehigh Creek and Jordan Creek into the Lehigh River, which in turn joins the Delaware River in Easton.

Villages
Upper Macungie Township villages include Breinigsville, Fogelsville, Haafsville (in Weisenberg Township), Krocksville, Kuhnsville, Newtown, Ruppsville, and Trexlertown.

Climate
The township has a hot-summer humid continental climate (Dfa) and the hardiness zone is 6b.

Adjacent municipalities
Lower Macungie Township (southeast)
South Whitehall Township (northeast)
North Whitehall Township (tangent to the north)
Lowhill Township (north)
Weisenberg Township (northwest)
Maxatawny Township, Berks County (west)
Longswamp Township, Berks County (southwest)

Demographics

As of 2020, the population of the township was 26,377. As of the 2010 census, there were 20,063 people and 7,843 households residing in the township. The population density was 529.5 people per square mile (204.5/km2).  There were 7,843 housing units at an average density of 203.3/sq mi (78.5/km2).  The racial makeup of the township was 84.96% White, 2.68% African American, 0.14% Native American, 8.96% Asian, 1.03% from other races, and 1.70% from two or more races. Hispanic or Latino of any race were 4.92% of the population.

There were 7,843 households, out of which 35.8% had children under the age of 18 living with them, 66.0% were married couples living together, 6.5% had a female householder with no husband present, and 25.2% were non-families. 20.2% of all households were made up of individuals, and 8.8% had someone living alone who was 65 years of age or older.  The average household size was 2.65 and the average family size was 3.08.

In the township, the population was spread out, with 27.2% under the age of 18, 3.71% from 19 to 24, 36.08% from 25 to 49 and 31.1% age 50 or older.  The median age was 39 years. For every 100 females, there were 92.9 males.  For every 100 females age 18 and over, there were 92.9 males. The median income for a household in the township was $85,600, and the median income for a family was $97,180.  Upper Macungie has one of the highest median family incomes in the state of Pennsylvania with an amount nearly double the state average. Males had a median income of $57,971 versus $38,490 for females. The per capita income for the township was $35,506.  About 0.8% of families and 2.6% of the population were below the poverty line, including 1.8% of those under age 18 and 9.0% of those age 65 or over.

Government and politics

Legislators
State Representative Gary Day, Republican, 187th district, 1st, 2nd, 3rd, and 5th wards
State Representative Ryan Mackenzie, Republican, 134th district, 4th ward
State Senator Pat Browne, Republican, 16th district
U.S. Representative: Susan Wild, Democrat, 7th district

Police and fire
Upper Macungie Township is served by the Upper Macungie Township Police Department. Prior to 2012, it was served by the now defunct Berks-Lehigh Regional Police.

Fire and emergency services are provided by:
Fogelsville Volunteer Fire Company, Lehigh County Station 8
Good Will Fire Co. No. 1 of Trexlertown, Lehigh County Station 25
Upper Macungie Township Emergency Services Bldg., Lehigh County Station 56

Public education
The township is served by Parkland School District. Students in grades 9-12 attend Parkland High School in the district. 

Most of its middle school students attend Springhouse Middle School except those in the far north of the township. The district maintains six elementary schools for students in kindergarten through fifth grades, including Fogelsville, Fred J. Jaindl, and Veterans Memorial Elementary Schools in Upper Macungie, and Cetronia, Kernsville, and Parkway Manor Elementary Schools located elsewhere in the district.

Transportation

Interstate 78 and U.S. Route 22 run through Fogelsville at exit 49, where they meet Pennsylvania Route 100; they are the primary east-to-west roads. U.S. Route 222 runs from the southwest to the northeast, while Pennsylvania Route 100, Interstate 476, and Pennsylvania Route 863 are the primary north-to-south roads. Another important east-to-west road is Schantz Road, which serves multiple industrial and commerce parks and nearly traverses the township. LANta bus routes 213, 218, and 322 serve the township.

References

External links

Townships in Lehigh County, Pennsylvania
Townships in Pennsylvania